Roger Sherman (1721–1793) was an American lawyer, politician, and founding father.

Roger Sherman may also refer to:

 Roger Sherman (American football) (1872–1957)
 Roger Sherman (politician)
 Roger Minott Sherman (1773–1844), judge
Roger Sherman (filmmaker) (born 1951)